Barito Kuala Regency is one of the regencies (kabupaten) in the Indonesian province of South Kalimantan. The area is 2,996.46 km2, and the population was 276,147 at the 2010 Census and 313,021 at the 2020 Census; the latest official estimate (as at mid 2021) was 316,963. The capital is the town of Marabahan. The Motto of the Regency is "Selidah".

Administrative Districts 
The Regency is divided into seventeen districts, tabulated below with their areas and population totals from the 2010 Census and 2120 Census, together with the official estimates for mid 2021. The table also includes the locations of the district administrative centres, the number of administrative villages (rural desa and urban kelurahan) in each district, and its postal codes.

Note: (a) including 3 small offshore or riverine islands.

Climate
Marabahan, the seat of the regency has a tropical rainforest climate (Af) with heavy rainfall from October to May and moderate rainfall from June to September.

References

External links 

 

Regencies of South Kalimantan